Mary Howitt (12 March 1799-30 January 1888) was an English poet, the author of the famous poem The Spider and the Fly. She translated several tales by Hans Christian Andersen. Some of her works were written in conjunction with her husband, William Howitt. Many, in verse and prose, were intended for young people.

Background and early life
Mary Botham, daughter of Samuel Botham and Ann, was born at Coleford, Gloucestershire, where her parents lived temporarily, while her father, a prosperous Quaker surveyor and former farmer of Uttoxeter, Staffordshire, looked after some mining property. In 1796, aged 38, Samuel had married 32-year-old Ann, daughter of a Shrewsbury ribbon-weaver. They had four children: Anna, Mary, Emma and Charles. Their Queen Anne house is now called Howitt Place. Mary Botham was taught at home, read widely and began writing verse at a very early age.

Marriage and writing
On 16 April 1821 she married William Howitt and began a career of joint authorship with him. Her life was bound up with that of her husband; she was separated from him only during a period when he journeyed to Australia (1851–1854). She and her husband wrote over 180 books.

The Howitts lived initially in Heanor in Derbyshire, where William was a pharmacist. Not until 1823, when they were living in Nottingham, did William decide to give up his business with his brother Richard and concentrate with Mary on writing. Their literary productions at first consisted mainly of poetry and other contributions to annuals and periodicals. A selection appeared in 1827 as The Desolation of Eyam and other Poems.

The couple mixed with many literary figures, including Charles Dickens, Elizabeth Gaskell and Elizabeth Barrett Browning. On moving to Esher in 1837, Howitt began writing a long series of well-known tales for children, with signal success. In 1837 they toured Northern England and stayed with William and Dorothy Wordsworth. Their work was generally well regarded: in 1839 Queen Victoria gave George Byng a copy of Mary's Hymns and Fireside Verses.

William and Mary moved to London in 1843, and after a second move in 1844, counted Tennyson amongst their neighbours. In 1853 they moved to West Hill in Highgate close to Hillside, the home of their friends, the physician and sanitary reformer Thomas Southwood Smith and his partner, the artist Margaret and her sister Mary Gillies. Mary Howitt had some years earlier arranged that the children's writer Hans Christian Andersen would visit Hillside to see the haymaking during his trip to England in 1847.

Scandinavia

In the early 1840s Mary Howitt was residing in Heidelberg, where her literary friends included Shelley's biographer Thomas Medwin and the poet Caroline de Crespigny, and her attention was drawn to Scandinavian literature. She and a friend, Madame Schoultz, set about learning Swedish and Danish. She then translated into English and introduced Fredrika Bremer's novels (1842–1863, 18 vols). Howitt also translated many of Hans Christian Andersen's tales, such as 
Only a Fiddler (1845)
The Improvisators (1845, 1847) 
Wonderful Stories for Children (1846)
The True Story of every Life (1847).

Among her original works were The Heir of Wast-WayIand (1847). She edited for three years the Fisher’s Drawing Room Scrap Book, writing, among other articles, "Biographical Sketches of the Queens of England". She edited the Pictorial Calendar of the Seasons, added an original appendix to her husband's translation of Joseph Ennemoser's History of Magic, and took the chief share in The Literature and Romance of Northern Europe (1852). She also produced a Popular History of the United States (2 vols, 1859), and a three-volume novel called The Cost of Caergwyn (1864).

Mary's brother-in-law Godfrey Howitt, his wife and her family emigrated to Australia, arriving at Port Phillip in April 1840. In June 1852, the three male Howitts, accompanied by Edward La Trobe Bateman, sailed there, hoping to make a fortune. Meanwhile, Mary and her two daughters moved into The Hermitage, Bateman's cottage in Highgate, which had previously been occupied by Dante Gabriel Rossetti.

The men returned from Australia a number of years later. William wrote several books describing its flora and fauna. Their son, Alfred William Howitt, achieved renown as an Australian explorer, anthropologist and naturalist; he discovered the remains of the explorers Burke and Wills, which he brought to Melbourne for burial.

Mary Howitt had several other children. Charlton Howitt was drowned while engineering a road in New Zealand. Anna Mary Howitt spent a year in Germany with the artist Wilhelm von Kaulbach, an experience she wrote up as An Art-Student in Munich. She married Alaric Alfred Watts, wrote a biography of her father, and died while on a visit to her mother in Tirol in 1884. Margaret Howitt wrote the Life of Fredrika Bremer and a memoir of her own mother.

Mary Howitt's name was attached as author, translator or editor to at least 110 works. She received a silver medal from the Literary Academy of Stockholm, and on 21 April 1879 gained a civil list pension of £100 a year. In her declining years she joined the Roman Catholic Church, and was one of an English deputation received by Pope Leo XIII on 10 January 1888. Her Reminiscences of my Later Life were printed in Good Words in 1886. The Times wrote of her and her husband:
Their friends used jokingly to call them William and Mary, and to maintain that they had been crowned together like their royal prototypes. Nothing that either of them wrote will live, but they were so industrious, so disinterested, so amiable, so devoted to the work of spreading good and innocent literature, that their names ought not to disappear unmourned.

Mary Howitt was away from her residence in Meran in Tirol, spending the winter in Rome, when she died of bronchitis on 30 January 1888.

Her works

Among those written independently of her husband were: 
Sketches of Natural History (1834)
Wood Leighton, or a Year in the Country (1836)
Birds and Flowers and other Country Things (1838)
Hymns and Fireside Verses (1839)
Hope on, Hope ever, a Tale (1840)
Strive and Thrive (1840)
Sowing and Reaping, or What will come of it (1841)
Work and Wages, or Life in Service (1842)
Which is the Wiser? or People Abroad (1842)
Little Coin, Much Care (1842)
No Sense like Common Sense (1843)
Love and Money (1843)
My Uncle the Clockmaker (1844)
The Two Apprentices (1844)
My own Story, or the Autobiography of a Child (1845)
Fireside Verses (1845)
Ballads and other Poems (1847)
The Children's Year (1847)
The Childhood of Mary Leeson (1848)
Our Cousins in Ohio (1849)
The Heir of Wast-Wayland (1851)
The Dial of Love (1853)
Birds and Flowers and other Country Things (1855)
The Picture Book for the Young (1855)
M. Howitt's Illustrated Library for the Young (1856; two series)
Lillieslea, or Lost and Found (1861)
Little Arthur's Letters to his Sister Mary (1861)
The Poet's Children (1863)
The Story of Little Cristal (1863)
Mr. Rudd's Grandchildren (1864)
Tales in Prose for Young People (1864)
M. Howitt's Sketches of Natural History (1864)
Tales in Verse for Young People (1865)
Our Four-footed Friends (1867)
John Oriel's Start in Life (1868)
Pictures from Nature (1869)
Vignettes of American History (1869)
A Pleasant Life (1871)
Birds and their Nests (1872)
Natural History Stories (1875)
Tales for all Seasons (1881)
Tales of English Life, including Middleton and the Middletons (1881)

The Spider and the Fly

The poem was originally published in 1829. When Lewis Carroll was readying Alice's Adventures Under Ground for publication, he replaced a parody he had made of a negro minstrel song with the "Lobster Quadrille", a parody of Mary's poem.

The poem became a Caldecott Honor Book in October 2003.

References

Further reading
Mary Howitt: an Autobiography, edited by her daughter, Margaret Howitt (1889)
C. R. Woodring, Victorian Samplers – William & Mary Howitt (1952)
A. Lee, Laurels and Rosemary – The Life of William & Mary Howitt (1955)

External links

Complete list of her works

Papers of Mary and William Howitt are held at Manuscripts and Special Collections, The University of Nottingham 

1799 births
1888 deaths
English women poets
19th-century English poets
19th-century English women writers
19th-century British translators
Swedish–English translators
Danish–English translators
German–English translators
English Quakers
Deaths from bronchitis
People from Coleford, Gloucestershire